Rosterolone (developmental code name SH-434), also known as 17α-propylmesterolone or 1α-methyl-17α-propyl-5α-androstan-17β-ol-3-one, is a steroidal antiandrogen which was first described in 1984 and was developed for topical administration but was never marketed. It has shown some efficacy in the treatment of acne, and lacks systemic effects with either topical or systemic administration. Rosterolone is a derivative of mesterolone, which, in contrast, is an androgen and anabolic steroid.

See also 
 Steroidal antiandrogen -chemical
 List of steroidal antiandrogens

References 

Abandoned drugs
Androstanes
Anti-acne preparations
Steroidal antiandrogens